Carlos Alberto Valderrama Palacio (born 2 September 1961), also known as El Pibe ("The Kid"), is a Colombian former professional footballer and sports commentator for Fútbol de Primera, who played as an attacking midfielder. In 2004, he was named by Pelé in the FIFA 100 list of the world's greatest living players.

A creative playmaker, he is regarded as one of the best Colombian footballers of all time, and by some as Colombia's greatest player ever and along with that is recognized as a Football legend. His distinctive hairstyle, as well as his precise passing and technical skills made him one of South America's most recognisable footballers in the late 1980s and early 1990s. He won the South American Footballer of the Year award in 1987 and 1993, and in 1999, he was also named one of the top 100 players of the 20th century by World Soccer.

Valderrama was a member of the Colombia national football team from 1985 until 1998. He represented Colombia in 111 full internationals and scored 11 times, making him the second-most capped player in the country's history, behind only David Ospina. He played a major role during the golden era of Colombian football in the 1990s, representing his national side in three FIFA World Cups and five Copa América tournaments.

After spending most of his career playing club football in South America and Europe, towards the end of his career Valderrama played in Major League Soccer, joining the league in its first season. One of the most recognisable players in the league at the time of its inception, he helped popularise the league during the second half of the 1990s. To this day, he is an icon and is considered one of the most decorated players to ever play in MLS; in 2005, he was named to the MLS All-Time Best XI.

Club career

Colombia and Europe
Born in Santa Marta, Colombia, Valderrama began his career at Unión Magdalena of the Colombian First Division in 1981. He also later played for Millonarios in 1984. He joined Deportivo Cali in 1985, where he played most of his Colombian football. In 1988, he moved to the French First Division side Montpellier. He struggled to adapt to the less technical and the faster, more physical, and tactical brand of football being played in Europe, losing his place in the squad. However, his passing ability later saw him become the club's main creative force, and he played a decisive role as his side won the Coupe de France in 1990. In 1991, he remained in Europe and joined Spanish side Real Valladolid for a season. He then returned to Colombia in 1992 and went on to play for Independiente Medellín, and subsequently Atlético Junior in 1993, with whom he won the Colombian championship in 1993 and 1995.

MLS career

Valderrama began his Major League Soccer career with the US side Tampa Bay Mutiny in the league's inaugural 1996 season. The team won the first ever Supporters' Shield, awarded for having the league's best regular season record, while Valderrama was the league's first Most Valuable Player, finishing the season with 4 goals and 17 assists. He remained with the club for the 1997 season, and also spent a spell on loan back at Deportivo Cali in Colombia, before moving to another MLS side, Miami Fusion, in 1998, where he also remained for two seasons. He returned to Tampa Bay in 2000, spending two more seasons with the club; while a member of the Mutiny, the team would sell Carlos Valderrama wigs at Tampa Stadium. In the 2000 MLS season, Valderrama recorded the only 20+ assist season in MLS history—ending the season with 26 — a single season assist record that remains intact to this day, and which MLS itself suggested was an "unbreakable" record in a 2012 article. In 2001, Valderrama joined the Colorado Rapids, and remained with the team until 2002, when he retired; his American soccer league career spanned a total of eight years, during which he made 175 appearances. In the MLS, Valderrama scored relatively few goals (16) for a midfielder, but is the league's fourth all-time leader in assists (114) after Brad Davis (123), Steve Ralston (135) – a former teammate, and Landon Donovan (145). In 2005, he was named to the MLS All-Time Best XI.

International career
Valderrama was a member of the Colombia national football team from 1985 until 1998; he made 111 international appearances, scoring 11 goals, making him the most capped outfield player in the country's history. He represented and captained his national side in the 1990, 1994, and 
1998 FIFA World Cups, and also took part in the 1987, 1989, 1991, 1993, and 1995 Copa América tournaments.

Valderrama made his international debut on 27 October 1985, in a 3–0 defeat to Paraguay in a 1986 World Cup qualifying match, at the age of 24. In his first major international tournament, he helped Colombia to a third-place finish at the 1987 Copa América in Argentina, as his team's captain, where he was named the tournament's best player; during the tournament he scored the opening goal in Colombia's 2–0 over Bolivia on 1 July, their first match of the group stage.

Some of Valderrama's most impressive international performances came during the 1990 FIFA World Cup in Italy, during which he served as Colombia's captain. He helped his team to a 2–0 win against the UAE in Colombia's opening match of the group stage, scoring the second goal of the match with a strike from 20 yards. Colombia lost their second match against Yugoslavia, however, needing at least a draw against the eventual champions West Germany in their final group match in order to advance to the next round of the competition. In the decisive game, German striker Pierre Littbarski scored what appeared to be the winning goal in the 88th minute of the game; however, within the last minute of injury time, Valderrama beat several opposing players and made a crucial left-footed pass to Freddy Rincón, who subsequently equalised, sealing a place for Colombia in the second round of the tournament with a 1–1 draw. Colombia were eliminated in the round of 16, following a 2–1 extra time loss to Cameroon.

On 5 September 1993, Valderrama contributed to Colombia's historic 5–0 victory over South American rivals Argentina at the Monumental in Buenos Aires, which allowed them to qualify for the 1994 World Cup. Although much was expected of Valderrama at the World Cup, an injury during a pre-tournament warm-up game put his place in the squad in jeopardy; although he was able to regain match fitness in time for the tournament, Colombia disappointed and suffered a first round elimination following defeats to Romania and the hosts USA, though it has been contributed by the internal problem and threats by cartel groups at the time.

Four years later, Valderrama led his nation to qualify for the 1998 World Cup in France, scoring three goals during the qualifying stages. His impact in the final tournament at the advancing age of 37, however, was less decisive, and, despite defeating Tunisia, Colombia once again suffered a first round exit, following a 2–0 defeat against England, which was Valderrama's final international appearance.

Playing style
Although Valderrama is often defined as a 'classic number 10 playmaker', due to his creativity and offensive contribution, in reality he was not a classic playmaker in the traditional sense. Although he often wore the number 10 shirt throughout his career and was deployed as an attacking midfielder at times, he played mostly in deeper positions in the centre of the pitch – often operating in a free role as a deep-lying playmaker, rather than in more advanced midfield positions behind the forwards – in order to have a greater influence on the game. A team-player, Valderrama was also known to be an extremely selfless midfielder, who preferred assisting his teammates over going for goal himself; his tactical intelligence, positioning, reading of the game, efficient movement, and versatile range of passing enabled him to find space for himself to distribute and receive the ball, which allowed him both to set the tempo of his team in midfield with short, first time exchanges, or create chances with long lobbed passes or through balls.

Valderrama's most instantly recognisable physical features were his big afro-blonde hairstyle, jewelry, and moustache, but he was best known for his grace and elegance on the ball, as well as his agility, and quick feet as a footballer. His control, dribbling ability and footwork were similar to those of smaller players, which for a player of Valderrama's size and physical build was fairly uncommon, and he frequently stood out throughout his career for his ability to use his strength, balance, composure, and flamboyant technique to shield the ball from opponents when put under pressure, and retain possession in difficult situations, often with elaborate skills, which made him an extremely popular figure with the fans. Valderrama's mix of physical strength, two-footed ability, unpredictability and flair enabled him to produce key and incisive performances against top-tier teams, while his world class vision and exceptional passing and crossing ability with his right foot made him one of the best assist providers of his time; his height, physique and elevation also made him effective in the air, and he was also an accurate free kick taker and striker of the ball, despite not being a particularly prolific goalscorer.

Despite his natural talent and ability as a footballer, Valderrama earned a reputation for having a "languid" playing style, as well as lacking notable pace, being unfit, and for having a poor defensive work-rate on the pitch, in particular, after succumbing to the physical effects of ageing in his later career in the MLS. In his first season in France, he also initially struggled to adapt to the faster-paced, more physical and tactically rigorous European brand of football, which saw him play in an unfamiliar position, and gave him less space and time on the ball to dictate attacking passing moves; he was criticised at times for his lack of match fitness and his low defensive contribution, which initially limited his appearances with the club, although he later successfully became a key creative player in his team's starting line-up due to his discipline, skill, and his precise and efficient passing. Despite these claims, earlier in his career, however, Valderrama demonstrated substantial pace, stamina, and defensive competence.

Former French defender Laurent Blanc, who played with Valderrama in Montpellier, voiced one of the most accurate descriptions for Valderrama, "In the fast and furious European game he wasn't always at his ease. He was a natural exponent of 'toque', keeping the ball moving. But he was so gifted that we could give him the ball when we didn't know what else to do with it knowing he wouldn't lose it... and often he would do things that most of us only dream about."

Retirement and legacy
In February 2004, Valderrama ended his 22-year career in a tribute match at the Metropolitan stadium of Barranquilla, with some of the most important football players of South America, such as Diego Maradona, Enzo Francescoli, Iván Zamorano, and José Luis Chilavert.

In 2006, a 22-foot bronze statue of Valderrama, created by Colombian artist Amilkar Ariza, was erected outside Estadio Eduardo Santos in Valderrama's birthplace of Santa Marta.

Valderrama was the only Colombian to feature in FIFA's 125 Top Living Football Players list in March 2004.

Media
Valderrama appeared on the cover of Konami's International Superstar Soccer Pro 98. In the Nintendo 64 version of the game, he is referred to by his nickname, El Pibe.

Valderrama has also appeared in EA Sports' FIFA football video game series; he was named one of the Ultimate Team Legend cards in FIFA 15.

Besides his link to videogames, Valderrama has been present in sports media through his work with Fútbol de Primera, Andrés Cantor's radio station. He works as a color commentator during broadcasts of different matches, mostly participating during the FIFA World Cup, alongside play-by-play commentators like Sammy Sadovnik or Cantor himself.

Coaching career
Since retiring from professional football, Valderrama has become assistant manager of Atlético Junior. On 1 November 2007, Valderrama accused a referee of corruption by waving cash in the face of Oscar Julian Ruiz when the official awarded a penalty to América de Cali. Junior lost the match 4–1, which ended the club's hopes of playoff qualification. He later also served as a coach for a football academy called Clearwater Galactics in Clearwater, Florida.

Personal life
Valderrama is married and has six children.

Career statistics

Club

International
Scores and results list Colombia's goal tally first, score column indicates score after each Valderrama goal.

Honours

Montpellier
Coupe de France: 1990

Atletico Junior
 Colombian Championship: 1993, 1995

Tampa Bay Mutiny
MLS Supporters' Shield: 1996

Individual
Copa América MVP: 1987
South American Footballer of the Year: 1987, 1993
South American Team of the Year: 1987, 1993, 1996
MLS All-Star of the Year: 1996
Major League Soccer MVP: 1996
World Soccer's 100 Greatest Footballers of All Time: 1999
Colombian Player of the Century: 1999
MLS Assist leader: 2000 (26 assists – a single season record)
FIFA 100: 2004
MLS All-Time Best XI: Midfielder
Golden Foot: 2013, as football legend

See also
List of men's footballers with 100 or more international caps

References

External links

 
 International statistics at Rec.Sport.Soccer Statistics Foundation
 Profile at Colombia.com 
 Power 5 Unbreakable Records – Valderrama's 26 assists in 2000 at mlssoccer.com

1961 births
Living people
People from Santa Marta
Colombian footballers
Association football midfielders
Categoría Primera A players
Ligue 1 players
La Liga players
Major League Soccer players
Colombian expatriate footballers
Expatriate footballers in France
Expatriate footballers in Spain
Expatriate soccer players in the United States
Colombian expatriate sportspeople in France
Colombian expatriate sportspeople in Spain
Colombian expatriate sportspeople in the United States
Unión Magdalena footballers
Millonarios F.C. players
Deportivo Cali footballers
Montpellier HSC players
Real Valladolid players
Independiente Medellín footballers
Atlético Junior footballers
Tampa Bay Mutiny players
Miami Fusion players
Colorado Rapids players
Colombia international footballers
1987 Copa América players
1989 Copa América players
1990 FIFA World Cup players
1991 Copa América players
1993 Copa América players
1994 FIFA World Cup players
1995 Copa América players
1998 FIFA World Cup players
FIFA Century Club
FIFA 100
South American Footballer of the Year winners
Major League Soccer All-Stars
Colombian people of African descent
Sportspeople from Magdalena Department